Ismet Mulavdić (born 19 October 1968) is a retired Bosnian-Herzegovinian footballer who played for Zvijezda Gradačac, FK Sarajevo, HNK Šibenik and Belgian side KRC Genk.

References

1968 births
Living people
People from Gradačac
Association football midfielders
Yugoslav footballers
Bosnia and Herzegovina footballers
FK Sarajevo players
HNK Šibenik players
K.R.C. Genk players
Yugoslav First League players
Croatian Football League players
Belgian Pro League players
Challenger Pro League players
Bosnia and Herzegovina expatriate footballers
Expatriate footballers in Croatia
Bosnia and Herzegovina expatriate sportspeople in Croatia
Expatriate footballers in Belgium
Bosnia and Herzegovina expatriate sportspeople in Belgium